State Road 200 (SR 200) is a major diagonal road in central and northeast Florida. Its southern terminus is at US 41 (SR 45) in Hernando (Citrus County). Its northern terminus is at SR A1A in Fernandina Beach (Nassau County), at the corner of Atlantic Avenue and Fletcher Avenue.

Route description
SR 200 is signed from Hernando through Apache Shores and Stokes Ferry in Citrus County, passing a narrow bridge over the Withlacoochee River. Entering Marion County, it passes by the Ross Prairie State Forest and continues through Marion Oaks to Ocala, where it later becomes an unsigned route for US 301 north to Callahan. Then it is signed again from Callahan where it's also signed concurrently with SR A1A. The segment that is overlapped with SR A1A runs along the northern edge of the Four Creeks State Forest, through Italia, and later passes under Interstate 95 at Exit 373. From there it passes through Yulee where it crosses the CSX Kingsland Subdivision and then US 17. East of there it passes through the wetlands of Lofton Creek, and then turns southeast heading through O'Neil. The routes curve back to the northeast climbing the Thomas J. Shave Jr. Bridge over the Amelia River and finally enters Fernandina Beach, where it makes a sharp curve to the north before turning to the right on Atlantic Avenue, and finally terminates at South Fletcher Avenue.

Gallery

Major intersections

Related routes

Former State Road 200A

State Road 200A (SR 200A) in Ocala and northern Marion County is now County Road 200A. It was also former U.S. Route 301 Alternate. The first segment is named 20th Street and begins at US 301 in Ocala north of a railroad bridge. Upon reaching Northeast Eighth Road, former SR 200 becomes Jacksonville Road, a street name it carries until it terminates with US 301 in Citra. Other County Road 200A's can be found in Alachua, Bradford, and Nassau Counties.

Alachua County

County Road 200A exists in two segments; One in Island Grove, and the other in Hawthorne. The road is also a former segment of US 301.

Bradford County

County Road 200A is one of two suffixed alternates of State Road 200 in Lawtey. It runs along the west side of US 301/SR 200 from the aforementioned route through CR 225 (Madison Street). One block later the route turns right onto Lake Street and runs for three blocks until it terminates at the north end of a multiplex with US 301 and CR 225.

County Road 200B

County Road 200B is another one of the two suffixed alternates of State Road 200 in Lawtey. It runs along the east side of US 301/SR 200 and begins at the same route just north of the southern terminus of CR 200A. CR 200B runs east to cross the CSX Wildwood Subdivision, then winds around local streets within Lawtey until it terminates at CR 225 (Lake Street).

Nassau County

County Road 200A is  the last suffixed alternate of SR 200 in the state. It runs along Pages Dairy Road west of US 17 in Yulee and runs north of the road until it reaches Chester River Road(a.k.a.; Old Chester Road) in Lofton, then turns south along Chester River Road until it terminates at SR 200, which at this point is also multiplexed with SR A1A.

References

External links
Florida Route Log (SR 200)

200
200
200
200
200
200
200
200
U.S. Route 301
200

Popular Culture
/ Florida Man